Non Sawang is a sub-district (tambon) in Mueang Bueng Kan District, in Bueng Kan Province, northeastern Thailand. As of 2010, it had a population of 6,739 people, with jurisdiction over 11 villages.

References

Tambon of Bueng Kan province
Populated places in Bueng Kan province
Mueang Bueng Kan District